Guan Jinlin (born April 25, 1989) is a Chinese former competitive figure skater. He is the 2008 World Junior bronze medalist and finished in the top ten at four Four Continents Championships. He was assigned to the 2008 Trophée Eric Bompard and 2008 NHK Trophy Grand Prix events, but missed the 2008–09 season due to injury.

Programs

Competitive highlights
GP: Grand Prix; JGP: Junior Grand Prix

References

External links 

 

1989 births
Living people
Chinese male single skaters
Sportspeople from Qiqihar
World Junior Figure Skating Championships medalists
Figure skaters from Heilongjiang
Competitors at the 2011 Winter Universiade
Competitors at the 2013 Winter Universiade